Chang Ying is the name of:

Eileen Chang (1920–1995), born Chang Ying, Chinese writer
Ying Chang Compestine (born 1963), born Chang Ying, Chinese-born American writer
Chang Ying, a fictional character in the Singaporean TV series Kinship

See also
Zhang Ying (disambiguation) - "Chang" is the Wade–Giles equivalent of "Zhang"